Puerto Maldito is a Mexican action adventure film. It was filmed in 1977 and released in 1978.

Synopsis  
At the Mexican coast there's a rivalry between two families, the Changs and the Langs, this enmity earns power every day in the port, a place where the business of fish is very important. To defense the economy of the family they practice martial arts and ancient customs..

Cast 
 Mario Almada	
 Fernando Almada		
 Noé Murayama	
 Enrique Novi
 Daniela Romo
 Hortensia Santoveña		
 Amado Zumaya		
 José Chávez		
 Hu Huang Fu
 Baltazar Ramos

External links 
 

1977 films
1970s Spanish-language films
1970s action adventure films
Mexican action adventure films
1970s Mexican films